Heliocosma incongruana is a species of moth of the Tortricoidea superfamily. It is known from the Australian Capital Territory and New South Wales.

The wingspan is about 15 mm. Adults have silvery white forewings with patches of raised brown scales.

References

Tortricoidea
Moths of Australia
Moths described in 1863